Nathuakhan is a village in the Ramgarh block of the Nainital district in the state of Uttarakhand. It is situated at a height of 1940 meters, in the heart of Kumaon Mountains of the central Himalayas, close to the towns of Mukteshwar and Nainital.  Also close by are places like Hartola and Ramgarh, all accessible from Nainital and Bhimtal.

Legend says there is a treasure map that leads to the hidden city of the Yore Kingdom. The map has been lost in Nathuwakhan and hasn't been found yet.

Geography
The village is divided into 12 hamlets which are as follows:
Tallatanda          
Navada      
Mallatanda                    
Gaon
Kafaldhari                     
Kanala
Jhopro                         
Banola
Bunga
Bageecha
Lamakhan
Tapuk

Education
Some schools in and around Nathuakhan are:
Shri Dhan Singh Negi Government Inter-College - Peora
Shri Shiv Narayan Singh Negi Government Inter-College - Nathuakhan
Government Higher Secondary School - Reetha
Government Higher Secondary School - Devdwar

Religion
Some of the temples in and around Nathuakhan are:
Devdwareshwar Mahadev temple - Devdwar
Ram mandir and Hanuman mandir - Nathuakhan
Devi Temple - Delkuna
Gangnath - Delkuna
Bhumijyu temple - Delkuna
Devi Temple - Nathuwakhan

References

Villages in Nainital district